The gastrodermis is the inner layer of cells that serves as a lining membrane of the gastrovascular cavity of Cnidarians. The term is also used for the analogous inner epithelial layer of Ctenophores.

It has been shown that the gastrodermis is among the sites where early signals of heat stress are expressed in corals.

References

Digestive system